The 1971 New Orleans Saints season was the Saints' fifth season. The Saints drafted Archie Manning with their first round pick, the second overall.

Manning led the Saints to their first opening day victory in franchise history, scoring a touchdown run on a rollout on the final play of a 24–20 victory over the Los Angeles Rams, New Orleans' first over Los Angeles following four consecutive losses, including the Saints' inaugural game in 1967. Four weeks later, Manning engineered a 24–14 victory over the Dallas Cowboys, who would return to Tulane Stadium in January and win Super Bowl VI over the Miami Dolphins.

Offseason

NFL draft

Personnel

Staff

Roster

Regular season

Schedule

Game summaries

Week 1

Standings

References

External links 
 Saints on Pro Football Reference

New Orleans Saints
New Orleans Saints seasons
New Orl